This list is of the Natural Monuments of Japan within the Prefecture of Tokushima.

National Natural Monuments
As of 1 April 2021, twenty-five Natural Monuments have been designated, including four *Special Natural Monuments; Miune-Tenguzuka Miyama kumazasa and Rhododendron tschonoskii Communities spans the prefectural borders with Kōchi.

Prefectural Natural Monuments
As of 1 February 2021, sixty-three Natural Monuments have been designated at a prefectural level.

Municipal Natural Monuments
As of 1 May 2020, one hundred and forty-nine Natural Monuments have been designated at a municipal level.

See also
 Cultural Properties of Japan
 Parks and gardens in Tokushima Prefecture
 List of Places of Scenic Beauty of Japan (Tokushima)
 List of Historic Sites of Japan (Tokushima)

References

External links
  Cultural Properties in Tokushima Prefecture

 Tokushima
Tokushima Prefecture